The 2002 Ladbrokes.com Mosconi Cup, the ninth edition of the annual nine-ball pool competition between teams representing Europe and the United States, took place 19–22 December 2002 at the York Hall in Bethnal Green, London, England.

Team Europe won the Mosconi Cup for the first time since 1995 by defeating Team USA 12–9.

Teams

 1 Born outside the United States.

Results

Thursday, 19 December

Session 1

Friday, 20 December

Session 2

Session 3

Saturday, 21 December

Session 4

Session 5

Sunday, 22 December

Session 6

Session 7

References

External links
 Official homepage

2002
2002 in cue sports
2002 sports events in London
Sport in the London Borough of Tower Hamlets
2002 in English sport
December 2002 sports events in the United Kingdom